The men's doubles tournament at the 1992 US Open was held between August 31 and September 13, 1992, on the outdoor hard courts at the USTA National Tennis Center in New York City, United States. Jim Grabb and Richey Reneberg won the title, defeating Kelly Jones and Rick Leach in the final.

Seeds

Draw

Finals

Top half

Section 1

Section 2

Bottom half

Section 3

Section 4

External links
 Main draw
1992 US Open – Men's draws and results at the International Tennis Federation

 

Men's doubles
US Open (tennis) by year – Men's doubles